Abd Rabbo ( is a male Arabic given name and surname. Notable bearers of the name include:

Ibn ʿAbd Rabbih (860–940), Moorish writer and poet
Yasser Abed Rabbo (born 1944), Palestinian politician
Abd Rabbuh Mansur Al-Hadi (born 1945), Yemeni politician, President of Yemen
Abed Rabah (born 1975), Israeli footballer
Hosny Abd Rabo (born 1984), Egyptian footballer

See also
Abd Rabbo family incident, violent incident in 2009

Arabic masculine given names